The Agonoxeninae are a subfamily of moths.

History of classification
Formerly, the subfamily only contained four named species – all in the type genus Agonoxena – if (e.g. following Nielsen et al., 1996). Such a monotypic arrangement is fairly unusual in modern taxonomy without explicit need due to phylogenetic constraints.

Hodges (in Kristensen, 1999) retained the Blastodacnidae in the Agonoxenidae, giving a grouping of some 31 genera, and treating the whole as a subfamily Agonoxeninae of the grass-miner moths (Elachistidae). Collectively, the Agonoxenidae and "Blastodacnidae" are known as palm moths.

Genera
 Agonoxena Meyrick, 1921
 Asymphorodes (formerly in Cosmopterigidae)
 Cladobrostis
 Diacholotis
 Gnamptonoma
 Helcanthica
 Ischnopsis
 Nanodacna
 Nicanthes
 Pammeces Zeller, 1863 (formerly in Cosmopterigidae)
 Pauroptila
 Porotica
 Proterocosma (formerly in Cosmopterigidae)

Former genera
Blastodacna, Dystebenna, Haplochrois, Heinemannia and Spuleria are sometimes placed here, sometimes in the Elachistidae (or Blastodacnidae).

Other genera formerly placed here:
 Chrysoclista
 Colonophora
 Glaucacna
 Palaeomystella
 Panclintis
 Prochola
 Tocasta Busck, 1912
 Zaratha

References
Nielsen E.S., Edwards E.D. & Rangsi T.V. (eds.) (1996), Checklist of the Lepidoptera of Australia; Monographs on Australian Lepidoptera Volume 4; CSIRO Publishing, Melbourne, 1996 
Kristensen, N.P. (ed.), 1999. Handbook of Zoology: Bd. 4. Arthropoda: Insecta. Teilbd. 35, Lepidoptera, moths and butterflies. Vol. 1. Evolution, systematics, and biogeography. W.de Gruyter, Berlin.

 
Moth subfamilies
Elachistidae
Taxa named by Edward Meyrick